Auto Express is a weekly motoring magazine sold in the United Kingdom published by Autovia Limited. The editor-in-chief is Steve Fowler.

History and profile
Launched in September 1988, its 1,000th issue was published on 20 February 2008. Its only weekly competitor in Britain is the long established Autocar. In 2011, Auto Express was the biggest selling motoring magazine in Britain, with a circulation of 60,840.

Auto Express is known for its spy shots, and speculative illustrations of forthcoming cars. It also covers news, road tests, first drives, readers' letters and feedback, product tests, long term tests, used cars, prices, motorsport and comment columns. It has sister magazines in France: Auto Plus, and Germany: Auto Bild which follow the same format.

Since April 2001, Auto Express has published the J.D. Power rivalling "Driver Power" satisfaction survey, which shows the one hundred best and worst cars to own that year. Since 2002, Lexus has scored consecutive top ratings in the Auto Express customer satisfaction surveys in the United Kingdom.

In 2021, Auto Express and the rest of Dennis Publishing's automotive assets were spun-off as independent company called Autovia.

Car of the Year

2000 Skoda Fabia
2001 Mini Hatch
2002 Honda Jazz
2003 Volvo XC90
2004 Fiat Panda
2005 Ford Focus
2006 Citroen C4
2007 Ford Mondeo
2008 Jaguar XF
2009 Ford Fiesta
2010 Skoda Yeti
2011 Range Rover Evoque
2012 Toyota GT86
2013 SEAT Leon
2014 Mini Hatch
2015 Volvo XC90
2016 Mercedes-Benz E-Class
2017 Land Rover Discovery
2018 Jaguar I-Pace
2019 Tesla Model 3
2020 Skoda Octavia
2021 Hyundai Ioniq 5
2022 Nissan Ariya

References

External links
Auto Express website

Automobile magazines published in the United Kingdom
Sports magazines published in the United Kingdom
Weekly magazines published in the United Kingdom
Magazines established in 1988
Magazines published in London